The Vallis Palitzsch is a geological structure of the surface of the Moon. The name of the valley was given in 1964 by the International Astronomical Union and comes from the adjacent crater, which in turn was named after the German astronomer Johann Georg Palitzsch (1723–1788).

References

Valleys on the Moon